Allan J. Hornyak (born March 3, 1951) is an American former basketball player known for his high school and collegiate careers. Despite being selected in the 1973 NBA Draft by the Cleveland Cavaliers and also in the 1973 ABA Draft by the Indiana Pacers, Hornyak never played professional basketball.

Playing career

High school
Hornyak played at St. John Central High School in Bellaire, Ohio. He played the shooting guard position and set many scoring records while he attended. In his final two seasons (1967–68 and 1968–69), Hornyak led both the Ohio Valley Athletic Conference (OVAC) and the state of Ohio in scoring. His junior season saw him average 42.7 points per game en route to 812 total points, while his senior season saw him average 41.9 per game with a total of 923 points. His 86-point single game performance against Tiltonsville High School in 1969 set the all-time OVAC record (he followed that game with a 61-point performance against archrival Bellaire High School). He finished his prep career with a then-conference record 2,385 points.
During his senior year he gained national attention for his incredible scoring outbursts.

College
Ohio State University was the school who landed Hornyak even though he was highly recruited. He had to sit out his freshman season in 1969–70 due to NCAA rules at the time which prohibited freshmen athletes from playing on varsity teams. In his final three college seasons Hornyak led the Buckeyes in scoring and was named to the All-Big Ten Conference Team each year. He was an honorable mention All-American in his final two seasons. In just 69 career games Hornyak scored 1,572 points and averaged over 20 points per game. He was later inducted into the Ohio State Sports Hall of Fame.

Professional
Following his successful career at Ohio State, Hornyak was chosen by the Cleveland Cavaliers in the second round (26th overall) of the 1973 NBA Draft. That same spring, the Indiana Pacers of the American Basketball Association chose him the supplemental ABA Draft. Despite being drafted by two different teams, Hornyak never played professional basketball.

References

1951 births
Living people
All-American college men's basketball players
Basketball players from Ohio
Cleveland Cavaliers draft picks
Indiana Pacers draft picks
Ohio State Buckeyes men's basketball players
Parade High School All-Americans (boys' basketball)
People from Bellaire, Ohio
Shooting guards
American men's basketball players